The Eder  is a -long major river in Germany that begins in eastern North Rhine-Westphalia and passes in to Hesse, where it empties into the River Fulda.

History 
The river was first mentioned by the Roman historian Tacitus. In his Annals, he describes the Roman campaign against the Chatti under the command of Germanicus in 15 AD. Forty-five thousand soldiers of the Roman army destroyed the major centre of the Chatti, Mattium, directly after they crossed the Adrana (Eder).

In the Middle Ages, the river was known by the names; Aderna, Adarna, Adrina.

On the banks of the Eder, in the town of Schwarzenau, near Bad Berleburg, a religious group was founded in August 1708; the Schwarzenau Brethren. Eight adults were completely baptised thrice in the Eder. This group emigrated to America where they are still to be found.

As late as up to the end of the 19th century, the river was also known in local dialect as Edder. For instance, in Felsberg-Gensungen, the pharmacy is known as the Edder-Apotheke.

Gold in the Eder 
Sediments of the Eder contain a proportion of gold. The majority of this gold is said to originate from Eisenberg (Korbach), which contains one of the largest reserves of gold in Middle Europe. Gold is eroded out of the Eisenberg, for example, by the Itter stream, which, since the Edersee dam was built, flows into the Edersee lake.

Gold panning in the Eder has been known since 1308. The main historical area for panning the gold is between Affoldern and Fritzlar. In the 14th Century, the Teutonic Order panned gold out of the Eder sediments near Obermöllrich. In the 18th century, even ducats were minted from Eder gold; they are collector's items today.

Up to the 1970s, school children from Duisburg, who stayed at a nearby holiday camp, together with a teacher from Marienhagen, part of the town of Vöhl, went panning for gold in the sediments of the River Itter. Panning for gold along the Eder is still popular.

Course 
The river rises from the Ederkopf mountain in the Rothaar mountain range in eastern North Rhine-Westphalia, near the springs of the Lahn and Sieg rivers. However, unlike the Lahn and Sieg, which are both tributaries of the Rhine, the Eder flows east and north, into the river Fulda at Edermünde, south of Kassel. The Fulda then converges with the Werra River at Hann. Münden to form the Weser River, which flows in to the North Sea.

Edersee Dam 

The Edersee Dam is situated below the town of Waldeck. It was completed in 1914; in 2014 its 100th birthday was celebrated. This is used to generate hydroelectricity and to regulate water levels for shipping on the Weser river.

At low water in late summer, and during dry years, the remnants of three villages (Asel, Bringhausen, and Berich) and a bridge across the original river bed, which was submerged when the lake was filled in 1914, can be seen. Descendants of those buried there go to visit the graves of their ancestors.

Destruction of the Eder dam 

On the night of the 17 May 1943, Avro Lancaster bombers of the RAF 617 Squadron used specially-developed bouncing bombs (codename: Upkeep) that were engineered by Barnes Wallis. They were used to destroy the Möhne and Eder dams, as part of Operation Chastise. The dam was repaired and in use again before the end of the year. The story of the raid was documented by the 1955 film called The Dam Busters.

Tributaries of the Eder 

The most important tributaries of the Eder are (listed first in Eder-kilometres from source to the Fulda):

 rivers that used to flow to the Eder, but now flow in to the Edersee lake.

References 

Rivers of Hesse
Rivers of North Rhine-Westphalia
Rivers of Siegerland
 
North Hesse
Rivers of Germany